Karen Beautle (born 13 June 1971) is a Jamaican athlete. She competed in the women's high jump at the 2000 Summer Olympics.

References

External links
 

1971 births
Living people
Athletes (track and field) at the 2000 Summer Olympics
Jamaican female high jumpers
Olympic athletes of Jamaica
Place of birth missing (living people)
Commonwealth Games medallists in athletics
Commonwealth Games bronze medallists for Jamaica
Athletes (track and field) at the 2006 Commonwealth Games
Medallists at the 2006 Commonwealth Games